Actinochaeta columbiae is a species of tachinid flies in the genus Actinochaeta of the family Tachinidae.

External links

Tachininae
Arthropods of Colombia
Insects described in 1889
Diptera of North America
Taxa named by Friedrich Moritz Brauer
Taxa named by Julius von Bergenstamm